Kanwarlal is a 1988 Indian Hindi-language action film, produced by G. Hanumantha Rao under the Padmalaya Studios banner, presented by Krishna and directed by S. S. Ravichandra. It stars Jeetendra, Raj Babbar, Sujata Mehta in lead roles and music composed by Bappi Lahiri. The film is a remake of the Malayalam film Rajavinte Makan (1986).

Plot
The film begins with an election campaign in which Surya Prakash young wily contests and wins with the highest majority. Then, he feints his beau Sandhya a law student, as a scapegoat for his gain. Thus, Sandhya loathes and discards him despite pregnancy. After a few years, Surya Prakash raises to minister. Besides, Kanwarlal is a daredevil businessman, justice-seeking hoodlum, and deity to the destitute. Surya Prakash antagonizes him to climb forward, so, the rivalry erupts. Surya Prakash exposes the illegal activities of Kanwarlal and files up the case. Further, he suborns public prosecutor Chathursen who accumulates the pieces of evidence. However, Kanwarlal is acquitted by heisting the file from Chathursen's junior Sandhya with guile. Accordingly, Sandhya is accused and arrested. Knowing it, Kanwarlal provides bail and tries to support her which she denies. The next, Surya Prakash too denounces Sandhya but she pluckily faces the consequences and starts her practice. Once, a lawbreaker John Johnny Janardhan approaches her and she surrenders him to Police. So, to avenge, he abducts her child when Surya Prakash omits to aid her. Hence, she seeks Kanwarlal who safely recoups the child. Moreover, he appoints Sandhya as his lawyer and she successfully pulls ahead whereby, he loves her and she also adores him. Parallelly, the battle between Kanwarlal & Surya Prakash ignites who moves the pawns and checkmates. Now, Surya Prakash gets despised which leads to his resignation. So, he plots to become Chief Minister through treason and also slaughters Kanwarlal's men. Here, Kanwarlal explodes and demolishes the vicious political forces. On the verge of killing Surya Prakash, he backs knowing him as the father of Sandhya's child. Tragically, Kanwarlal is backstabbed by Surya Prakash one that heckles him. At last, Kanwarlal virtuously knocks him down at his feet. Finally, the movie ends with Kanwarlal leaving his breath on Sandhya's lap.

Cast

 Jeetendra as Kanwarlal
 Raj Babbar as Minister Suraj Prakash
 Sujata Mehta as Advocate Sandhya
 Amjad Khan as John Jani Janardhan
 Arjun as Jagan
 Tiku Talsania as Advocate Uttamlal
 Birbal as Havaldar
 Jankidas as Trivedi
 Om Shivpuri as Public Prosecutor 
 Pinchoo Kapoor as Chief Minister
 Viju Khote as Ram Prasad
 Manmohan Krishna as Shastriji
 Tej Sapru as Jangha
 Rajan Haksar as IGP

Soundtrack

References

External links
 

1988 films
1980s Hindi-language films
1988 drama films
Films scored by Bappi Lahiri
Hindi remakes of Malayalam films
Indian gangster films
Films directed by S. S. Ravichandra